"Powerless" is a song by British drum and bass band Rudimental. It features the vocals from English singer Becky Hill. The song was released in the United Kingdom on 23 February 2014 as the sixth single from their debut studio album, Home (2013).

Music video
A music video to accompany the release of "Powerless" was first released onto YouTube on 29 January 2014 at a total length of three minutes and fifty-five seconds. It depicts the story of professional boxers Deano and Scotty Burrell, who are identical twin brothers.

Track listings

Chart performance

Weekly charts

Release history

References

2014 singles
2014 songs
Becky Hill songs
Rudimental songs
Asylum Records singles
Song recordings produced by Rudimental
Songs written by Becky Hill
Songs written by Amir Amor